Federal Route 199, or Jalan Batu Gajah, is a federal road in Kelantan, Malaysia. The route connects Kampung Batu Gajah in the north and Kampung Lawang in the south.

History  
In 2003, the highway was gazetted as Federal Route 199.

Features
At most sections, the Federal Route 199 was built under the JKR R5 road standard, allowing maximum speed limit of up to 90 km/h.

Major intersections 
The entire route is in Kelantan, Malaysia.

References

Malaysian Federal Roads
Roads in Kelantan